Prades Mountains, also known as Muntanyes de Prades, is a large calcareous mountain massif straddling the comarcas of Alt Camp, Baix Camp, Conca de Barberà, Garrigues and Priorat, in Catalonia, Spain. They are a Site of Community Importance.

These mountains have characteristic large and rounded rocky outcrops. They are mostly heavily forested with oak and pine trees, and the non-native chestnut tree has adapted to the local forests.

Geography
The range runs in an east to west direction and is part of the Catalan Pre-Coastal Range. The main peak is Tossal de la Baltasana (1203 m), other summits are Mola d'Estat (1127 m), Mola dels Quatre Termes (1117 m), La Mussara (1055 m), and Punta de la Barrina (1013 m). The 731 m high Tossal de la Creu is a visible landmark from the Poblet Monastery, located at the foot of the range.

The Francolí River has its source in these mountains as well as other minor local rivers.

Municipalities
The Prades Mountains are a large massif with many smaller subranges extending over the following municipal terms: L'Albiol, Alcover, L'Aleixar, Alforja, Almoster, Arbolí, Capafonts, Cornudella de Montsant, L'Espluga de Francolí, La Febró, Montblanc, Mont-ral, La Pobla de Cérvoles, Prades, La Riba, La Selva del Camp, Ulldemolins, Vallclara, Vilaplana, Vilanova de Prades, Vilaverd, El Vilosell and Vimbodí i Poblet.

Gallery

See also
Poblet Monastery
Catalan Pre-Coastal Range
Mountains of Catalonia

References

Bibliography
Domingo, Màrius. Muntanyes de Prades. Excursions naturals. Valls: Cossetània, 2000 
Domingo, M. i Borau, A. Muntanyes de Prades, Paisatge i Fauna. Valls: Cossetània, 1998 
Ferré Masip, Rafael. Les Muntanyes de Prades. Guia itinerària. Barcelona: Piolet, 2001 
Insa, Josep. Les Muntanyes de Prades. Caminant de poble a poble. Valls: Cossetània, 2005

External links

 Tourist information
 Tretzevents: Les Muntanyes de Prades
  Associació d'Amics de les Muntanyes de Prades
 Protected areas in CataloniaGeneralitat

Mountain ranges of Catalonia
Alt Camp
Baix Camp
Conca de Barberà
Garrigues (comarca)
Priorat